FZP, or fzp, may refer to:

 FZP, the Indian Railways code for Firozpur City railway station in the state of Punjab, India
 FZP, the National Rail code for Furze Platt railway station in the county of Berkshire, UK

See also